List of English writers lists writers in English, born or raised in England (or who lived in England for a lengthy period), who already have Wikipedia pages. References for the information here appear on the linked Wikipedia pages. The list is incomplete – please help to expand it by adding Wikipedia page-owning writers who have written extensively in any genre or field, including science and scholarship. Please follow the entry format. A seminal work added to a writer's entry should also have a Wikipedia page. This is a subsidiary to the List of English people. There are or should be similar lists of Irish, Scots, Welsh, Manx, Jersey, and Guernsey writers.

Abbreviations: AV = Authorized King James Version of the Bible, also as = also wrote/writes as, c. = circa; century, cc. = centuries; cleric = Anglican priest, fl. = floruit, RC = Roman Catholic, SF = science fiction, YA = young adult fiction

D

E

F

G

H

I

J

See also

English literature
English novel
List of children's literature authors
List of children's non-fiction writers
List of English-language poets
List of English novelists
Lists of writers